Yuri Catania (born November 29 1975) is an Italian photographer, director and creative director working in the fields of fashion and luxury. He won the Cavallo di Leonardo symbol of Milan, for the direction of Best Fashion Movie of the year by Milan Film festival internazionale di Milano on April, 2014. The movie was commissioned by Ermanno Scervino and starring Asia Argento. He was selected by Praz-Delavallade to exhibit some fine art photos from the series New Yorker at ART IS HOPE, at Palais de Tokyo in Paris, on November, 2013.  
 
Fashion Career: he worked as a photographer with: Chiara Ferragni, Victoria Cabello, Asia Argento, Francesco Carrozzini, Kate Nauta, Renzo Rosso, Lindsey Wixson, Nadja Bender, Rocky Mattioli, Dree Hemingway, Jessica Stam, Andreas Seppi, Fabio Fognini, Dylan Penn, Werner Schreyer, Sebastian Sauve, Coco Rocha, Alessandra Mastronardi, Andrea Denver, Elsa Hosk, Pyper America, Sara Sampaio, Renato Sobral, Lucky Blue Smith, Pyper America, Cara Delavingne, Gianluigi Buffon, Chiara Scelsi, Kanye West. 
 
Selected Clients: LaPerla, Rick Owens, Costume National, Ermanno Scervino, Avant Toi, Philipp Plein, Tatras, Fila, Moon Boots, Lucio Vannotti, Antonioli, Ash, Genten, Kasperskian, House of Sillage, Diesel Black Gold, Hollywood Trading Company, Posh Magazine, Reve Magazine

Awards:

 2017 – Special Mention for ``Asia Argento, un'attrice, un set e il cinema`` at Centro Candiani Venezia
 2016 – Bloom Award by Art Fair Colonia Nominee
 2012 – Highest Honor – Black & White Spider Award
 2008 – Honorable Mention Award – Premio Fotografico Italiano
 2007 – Awarded the Premio Fotografico Italiano – best still life

Other project: In 2019 He started like art director the shoes brand Revolver Requeen Venexia, in partnership with the Italian shoes factory Baldan.

Art Career: in 2006, Yuri Catania has started an artistic path in contraposition of his fashion career. The project, No Fashion Places, was exhibited in Milan, Venice, Paris, Tokyo and Zurich.

Solo Exhibitions

 2017, No Fashion Places, Chateau Monfort, Milano, Italy
 2017, No Fashion Places of America, Officine Fotografiche, Milano, Italy
 2018, No Fashion Places of America, Venice, Italy

Collective Exhibitions

 2016, Mia Photo Fair, The Mall, Milano, Italy
 2017, Mia Photo Fair, The Mall, Milano, Italy
 2017, #WithRefugees, Spazio Big Santa Marta, Milano, Italy

Book

In 2016, Yuri Catania published his first book, No Fashion Places of America, a collection of images from the American Scenario, the fruit of nine years working and traveling around the United States from the East to the West Coast.

Now: Yuri Catania is traveling now by an Airstream all the United States of America working on his second book. He's looking for real people to interview and discovering uncommon places. He has a blog: No Fashion Places of America where he tells some true stories of American people, places and lifestyle.

References

1975 births
Living people
Italian film directors
Italian photographers
Photographers from Milan
University of Milan alumni